The Santa Marta blossomcrown (Anthocephala floriceps) is a Vulnerable species of hummingbird in the "emeralds", tribe Trochilini of subfamily Trochilinae. It endemic to the Sierra Nevada de Santa Marta of Colombia.

Taxonomy and systematics

Anthocephala floriceps was originally called the blossomcrown and included what are now the Santa Marta blossomcrown and Tolima blossomcrown (Anthocephala berlepschi) as subspecies. A study by Lozano-Jaramillo et al. published in 2014 found that the two differed greatly both genetically and in their climatic niches. The South American Classification Committee of the American Ornithological Society and worldwide taxonomic systems soon adopted the split. The Santa Marta blossomcrown is monotypic.

Description

Both sexes have a straight black bill. The adult male has a buffy white forehead, a rufous chesnut hindcrown, mostly shining green upperparts, and a rusty lower back and uppertail coverts. Its underparts are grayish buff. Its tail is bronzy green with buffy tips to the feathers, and all but the central pair of feathers also have a black bar near the tip. Females and immatures are similar to the adult male but their whole crown is brownish.

Distribution and habitat

The Santa Marta blossomcrown is found only in the isolated Sierra Nevada de Santa Marta of northern Colombia.

Behavior

Movement

The Santa Marta blossomcrown is assumed to be sedentary, but its possible seasonal elevational movements have not been studied.

Feeding

The Santa Marta blossomcrown typically forages low in the forest understory. Its diet has not been studied, and the only documented nectar source is flowering banana.

Breeding

The Santa Marta blossomcrown's breeding season apparently includes September and October. Males gather in leks to court females. Nothing else is known about its breeding phenology.

Vocalization

The Santa Marta blossomcrown's song is "a long series of repeated tsip notes".

Status

The IUCN has assessed the Santa Marta blossomcrown as Vulnerable. It has a very small range and its population of fewer than 2500 mature individuals is believed to be decreasing. Much of its potential habitat has been cleared; what remains appears to be relatively stable though fragmented. Some of its remaining habitat is "at least nominally protected" in a national park and a foundation-owned preserve.

References

Santa Marta blossomcrown
Birds of the Colombian Andes
Birds of the Sierra Nevada de Santa Marta
Endemic birds of Colombia
Santa Marta blossomcrown
Taxonomy articles created by Polbot